The Mountain Men is a 1980 American Adventure Western film directed by Richard Lang and starring Charlton Heston and Brian Keith. Heston's son, Fraser Clarke Heston authored the screenplay.

Plot
Bill Tyler is an argumentative, curmudgeonly mountain man. Henry Frapp is Tyler's good friend and fellow trapper. Together, they trap beaver, fight Native Americans, and drink at a mountain man rendezvous while trying to sell their "plews", or beaver skins, to a cutthroat French trader named Fontenelle.

Tyler looks for a legendary valley, in Blackfoot territory, "so full of beaver that they just jump in the traps." Running Moon leaves her abusive husband, a ruthless Blackfoot warrior named Heavy Eagle, and comes across the two trappers in the dying days of the fur trapping era. While at first Bill only wants to take her to safety at the rendezvous, she refuses to leave and eventually becomes his woman. While trapping, Bill and Henry are attacked by Blackfeet and Henry is scalped by Heavy Eagle in front of Bill. Tyler runs back to camp and he and Running Moon flee only to be caught. Later, Tyler (thinking Running Moon has also been killed) is given a chance to run for his life (similar to the real life event of John Colter) and is chased by warriors whom he initially eludes by hiding in a beaver den. They pursue him until he and Heavy Eagle fall into a raging river. Heavy Eagle makes it to shore and Bill goes over a waterfall. Heavy Eagle returns to his camp and tries to make Running Moon his woman again, raping her, but she refuses to submit to him. He knows Bill Tyler survived and will come for her, just as he had done.

On his survival trek, Bill comes across Henry who had survived the scalping and eventually learns that Running Moon is still alive. He and Henry set out to rescue her while they are followed by another pair of trappers, Le Bont and Walters, who are also looking for the valley of beavers. After Le Bont and Walters are killed by Heavy Eagle and his warriors, Henry is shot in the chest with an arrow and dies in Tyler's arms. Tyler then sneaks into the Blackfoot camp and finds Running Moon, but before they can escape, Heavy Eagle arrives. Tyler and Heavy Eagle engage in hand-to-hand combat, and just as Heavy Eagle is about to kill Tyler with a knife, Running Moon shoots him with a musket, killing him. Tyler constructs a traditional Blackfoot sky burial platform next to a river and places Henry's corpse on it, before he and Running Moon ride away for the high country, in search of the beaver valley.

Cast
 Charlton Heston as Bill Tyler 
 Brian Keith as Henry Frapp 
 Victoria Racimo as Running Moon 
 Stephen Macht as Heavy Eagle 
 John Glover as Nathan Wyeth
 Seymour Cassel as La Bont
 David Ackroyd as Medicine Wolf 
 Cal Bellini as Cross Otter
 William Lucking as Jim Walter (as Bill Lucking)
 Ken Ruta as Fontenelle
 Victor Jory as Iron Belly
 Danny Zapien as Blackfoot Chief
 Tim Haldeman as Whiskey Clerk
 Buckley Norris as Trapper
 Daniel Knapp as Trapper
 Michael Greene as Trapper
 Stewart East as Trapper
 Terry Leonard as Crow Brave 
 Steven Chambers as Blackfoot Brave (as Steve D. Chambers)
 Bennie Dobbins as Blackfoot Brave
 Suzanna Trujillo as Iron Belly's Squaw 
 Melissa Sylvia as Frapp's Squaw
 James Ecoffey as Dog Of the Sun

Locations
The film was shot in Wyoming at Bridger-Teton National Forest, Grand Teton National Park, Shoshone National Forest and Yellowstone National Park.

Reception
The film received mixed reviews with Michael Blowen of The Boston Globe stating the picture "is, quite simply, the worst film of the year." Variety assessed the film as "loaded with vulgarities, bloody, and takes ages to drag from one plot development to another." Both Gene Siskel and Roger Ebert gave the film negative reviews, selecting the film as one of their "dogs of the year" in a 1980 episode of Sneak Previews. Siskel added "Heston has simply failed to grow up, this is a 1950s movie in its look, its comedy and in its racist attitude towards Indians. It portrays them in some battle scenes as shuffling freaks in redface."  In his annual publication, Leonard Maltin rated the film BOMB and described it as "crude, bloody and tiresome good-guys-vs-Indians western."

Linda Gross of the Los Angeles Times gave a partially favorable review saying that "for the most part, the film...is an enjoyable yarn."  Marylynn Uricchio echoed the same assessment in The Pittsburgh Post-Gazette. In The New York Times, Janet Maslin praised the Wyoming scenery.
 
Heston later said "the film that you saw was not the film that we conceived or shot. We compromised. My son's script was much darker. It emphasized the sort of autumnal recognition that they earned as trappers. I confess that I miss that aspect bitterly. My son found it difficult to swallow. He poured everything into the script and he resented the changes. But all artists compromise. Every one of my films could have been better. Every one of them. My son learned that the people who put up the money control the film. When we saw the final cut, he was heartbroken....  I could have walked out. I could have put everything on the line but I don't like to do that. It was the director's (Richard Lang) first feature and I don't like to throw my weight around. But maybe I should have. Maybe I made a mistake."

See also
 List of American films of 1980

References

External links
 
 
 
 

1980 films
1980 Western (genre) films
American Western (genre) films
Columbia Pictures films
Films scored by Michel Legrand
Films set in 1838
Films shot in Wyoming
1980 directorial debut films
Films directed by Richard Lang (director)
1980s English-language films
1980s American films